This is a list of seasons played by Barnet Football Club in English football, from 1888, when the club first entered the FA Cup, to the most recent completed season. Barnet Football Club were formed in 1888, having formerly been known as New Barnet FC (1885–1888) and Woodville FC (1882–1885).

This list details the club's achievements in all competitions, and the top scorers for each season.

Seasons

Key

League results
Div = Division
Pos = Final position
P = Games played
W = Games won
D = Games drawn
L = Games lost
F = Goals for
A = Goals against
Pts = Points

Divisions
SLP = Southern Football League Premier Division
SL1 = Southern Football League Division One
AL = Athenian League
Div 3 = Football League Third Division
Div 4 = Football League Fourth Division
n/a = Not applicable

Cup results
P = Premliminary round
Q = Qualifying round
Q1 = Qualifying round 1
Q2 = Qualifying round 2
Q3 = Qualifying round 3
Q4 = Qualifying round 4
Q5 = Qualifying round 5
R1 = Round 1
R2 = Round 2
R3 = Round 3
R4 = Round 4
R5 = Round 5

Cup results (cont.)
QF = Quarter-finals 
SF = Semi-finals
RU = Runners-up
W = Winners
GS = Group stage
L16 = Last 16
FS = Final (South)

External links
Barnet Football Club Supporters Association Website

Barnet F.C.